Asian bond markets are growing rapidly as Asian borrowers switch away from short term bank loans towards longer term debt financing. Although Asia also includes countries of the Middle East, some CIS countries and the vast majority of the land mass of Russia and Turkey, in financial markets it is often only East Asia and South Asia that are included in the term.

Issuance
Issuance in Asia is predominantly issued by sovereign issuers but corporate bonds are becoming an important source of growth in Asian fixed-income markets. Currently issuance is predominantly in US dollars, although local currency issuance is also growing. Asian governments, central banks and the Asian Development Bank are keen to see the expansion of Asian bond markets over the next few years in order to help provide finance for the large infrastructural development that the region needs over the next decade. Alongside the expansion of the bond markets, Asian governments and central banks are currently discussing the creation of an Asian Currency Unit. The ADB has suggested that bonds may also be issued in ACU over the next few years. This would help lower the financing costs for Asian issuers who have substantial trade links with other countries in the region. 
 
Asian issuers tends to have a much higher credit rating than other sovereign debt, particularly those in Latin America because of the strong economic underpinnings and low political risks. Most Asian countries have ratings which are investment grade.

History
Asian economies suffered badly from the East Asian financial crisis in 1997 and subsequently academic research has identified the over-reliance on short term bank financing as a major cause of economic failure. Governments and central banks are keen to encourage the expansion of the Asian bond markets in order to reduce the reliance on short term bank loans and so avoid the economic catastrophe that occurred in 1997/1998.

Investing in Asian bonds
Large investors can buy bonds directly, whereas smaller investor tend to invest via mutual funds. The two major Asian bond indices are the HSBC Asian Bond Index and the JP Morgan JACI Index.

As part of the Asian Bond Market Initiative, nine Pan Asian Bond funds have been launched. These passively managed funds are designed to provide an efficient mechanism for investors to buy local currency funds. Whilst their low fees provide funds at an attractive price, the fee scales discourage active management and provides limited incentive for managers to promote these funds. As a result, these funds are not widely known.

The managers of the 8 single market funds are;

ABF China Bond Index Fund, China Asset Management Corporate Limited 
ABF Hong Kong Bond Index Fund, HSBC Investments (Hong Kong) Limited 
ABF Indonesia Bond Index Fund, PT Bahana TCW Investment Management 
ABF Korea Bond Index Fund, Samsung Investment Trust Management Company Limited 
ABF Malaysia Bond Index Fund, AmInvestment Management Sdn. Bhd. 
ABF Philippines Bond Index Fund, Bank of the Philippine Islands 
ABF Singapore Bond Index Fund, DBS Asset Management Limited 
ABF Thailand Bond Index Fund, Kasikorn Asset Management Company Limited

Asian Bond Markets Initiative
Asian Bond Markets Initiative (ABMI), which was endorsed at the ASEAN+3 Finance Ministers Meeting in Manila, the Philippines on 7 August 2003, aims to develop efficient and liquid bond markets in Asia, enabling better utilization of Asian savings for Asian investments. It would also contribute to the mitigation of currency and maturity mismatches in financing.

The activities of the Asian Bond Markets Initiative (ABMI) is focused on (1) Facilitating access to the market through a wider variety of issuers and (2) Enhancing market infrastructure to foster bond markets in Asia.

See also 
Developing countries' debt
Emerging Market Debt

External links 
A pile of BRICs or Asian CHIKS?
AsianBondsOnline
Asian Bond Fund
Asian Bond Market Initiative
The Asian Bond Market: 12 Things to Know Asian Development Bank

Bond market
 
Finance in Asia